The 1978 Barking Borough Council election took place on 4 May 1978 to elect members of Barking London Borough Council in London, England. The whole council was up for election and the Labour Party stayed in overall control of the council.

Background
6 new wards were created for this election and 113 candidates nominated in total.
Labour, once again, ran a full slate of candidates, and in keeping with the council's strong Labour vote, no other party ran in all wards. The Conservative Party had the second most candidates on the ballot at 28.

Election result
Labour continued to win a large majority of seats - 42 out of 48. For the first time since the 1968 elections the Conservatives won seats as well, 3 in all.

Ward results

Abbey

Alibon

Cambell

Chadwell Heath

Eastbrook

Eastbury

Fanshawe

Gascoigne

Goresbrook

Heath

Longbridge

Manor

Marks Gate

Parsloes

River

Thames

Triptons

Valence

Village

By-elections between 1978 and 1982

Cambell

The by-election was called following the death of Cllr. Bertie E. Roycraft.

Gascoigne

The by-election was called following the death of Cllr. Julia H. Engwell.

Triptons

The by-election was called following the death of Cllr. William E. Bellamy.

References

1978
Barking Borough council